Tumi Morake (born 22 December 1981) is a South African comedian, actress, TV personality, and writer.

In 2018, she became the first African woman to have her own set on Netflix. She is also known to be the first woman to host Comedy Central Presents in Africa.

Early years and education 
Morake was born in the Free State. She relocated to Gauteng in the year 2000 and there, she studied Drama at Wits University.

Career 
After completing her tertiary education at DUT, Morake started working at Arepp Theatre for Life, a touring educational theatre company. In July 2005, she joined the comedy industry. She worked at Parker Leisure Management and is known to perform regular stand-up gigs in Johannesburg and Pretoria. Some comedy festivals she has performed at include; Heavyweights Comedy Jam, Blacks Only, Have a Heart, Just Because Comedy Festival, The Tshwane Comedy Festival, The Lifestyle SA Festival and Old Mutual Comedy Encounters. She has hosted shows including; Our Perfect Wedding, Red Cake and WTFTumi (her talk show).

Filmography 
Morake has starred in several films and TV shows, including:

 Skin
 Kota Life Crisis 
 Soul Buddyz 
 Izoso Connexion 
 High Rollers
 Laugh Out Loud
 Rockville
  Soul Buddyz
 The Queen
 The Bantu Hour
 ekasi movies

 Seriously Single
 Tumi or Not Tumi (Netflix)

Works 

 She authored a book titled And Then Mama Said.

Awards and recognitions  

 She was named as one of The Free State Province's Icons
2012- Awarded Entertainer of the Year at the 2012 Speakers of Note Award
2013 - She is a recipient of the Mboko Women in the Arts Award for Excellence in Comedy 2013 
2016 - She won the Best Comedian Category of the YOU Spectacular Awards
 She won awarded the Savanna Comic Choice Awards as the Comic of the Year

Personal life 
She is married to Mpho Osei Tutu, a fellow South African actor and is a mother of three children.

References

Living people
1981 births
South African women comedians
South African actresses
People from the Free State (province)